Lake Huro is located in the Chatham Islands of New Zealand. It is located on Chatham Island to the southwest of Te Whanga Lagoon, close to the settlement of Waitangi.

References

Huro
Landforms of the Chatham Islands
Chatham Island